Faleloa is a settlement in Foa island, Tonga. It had a population of 380 in 2016.

References 

Populated places in Tonga
Haʻapai